Artūrs Kurucs (born 19 January 2000) is a Latvian professional basketball player for Kirolbet Baskonia of the Spanish Liga ACB and the EuroLeague.

Personal life
Kurucs' brother, Rodions, is also a professional basketball player.

References

2000 births
Living people
BK VEF Rīga players
Latvian expatriate basketball people in Spain
Latvian men's basketball players
Liga ACB players
People from Cēsis
Saski Baskonia players
Shooting guards